"Before I Die" is a song by American rock band Papa Roach released as the third single from their sixth studio album The Connection.

Personnel
Jacoby Shaddix – vocals
 Jerry Horton – lead guitar, backing vocals
 Tobin Esperance – bass guitar, programming, backing vocals
 Tony Palermo – drums, percussion

Track listing

References

Papa Roach songs
Electronic rock songs
2012 songs
Songs written by Jacoby Shaddix
Songs written by Tobin Esperance
Eleven Seven Label Group singles
Songs written by Jerry Horton